Mervyn "Muff" Winwood (born 15 June 1943, Erdington, Birmingham, England) is a British songwriter and record producer, and the elder brother of Steve Winwood. Both were members of the Spencer Davis Group in the 1960s, in which Muff Winwood played bass guitar. Following his departure from the group he became an A&R man and record producer.

Early life
Winwood's father, Lawrence, was a foundryman by trade, who also played tenor saxophone in dance bands and had a collection of jazz and blues records. Winwood attended Cranbourne Road Primary School and the new Great Barr School (one of the first comprehensive schools) and was a choir boy at St John's Church in the Perry Barr neighborhood of Birmingham. He first became interested in the guitar, then the bass. He was nicknamed "Muff" after the popular 1950's children's TV character Muffin the Mule.

His younger brother is Steve Winwood.

The Spencer Davis Group
 
The Spencer Davis Group was formed after Davis saw the Winwood brothers at a Birmingham pub called the Golden Eagle, performing as the Muff Woody Jazz Band. The Group made their debut at the Eagle and subsequently had a Monday-night residency there.

Record producer
After leaving the Spencer Davis Group in 1967, Winwood moved within the music industry to a position as A&R man at Island Records. He was there until 1978, when he became an executive at the British office of CBS Records (which later became Sony Music), where he remained until well into the 1990s. As part of his A&R duties, Winwood signed Prefab Sprout, Terence Trent D'Arby, Sade, Shakin' Stevens and The Psychedelic Furs amongst others.

In 1974, Winwood produced the Sparks hit album, Kimono My House along with its hit singles, "This Town Ain't Big Enough for Both of Us" and "Amateur Hour". He also produced their other 1974 album, Propaganda (which included the "Never Turn Your Back on Mother Earth" single). Later, he produced the first Dire Straits album, Dire Straits (1978). 

His other work included production with The Fabulous Poodles, Marianne Faithfull, Nirvana (the UK band), Sutherland Brothers ("Sailing"), Traffic, Mott the Hoople, Love Affair, Kevin Ayers, Patto, Unicorn, After the Fire and The Noel Redding Band.

See also
List of bass guitarists

References

External links
 
 
 
  (includes Muff Winwood references)

1943 births
People from Erdington
Living people
English songwriters
English rock bass guitarists
Male bass guitarists
English record producers
A&R people
Musicians from Birmingham, West Midlands
British rhythm and blues boom musicians
The Spencer Davis Group members